Raymond Stephen Perdriau (3 December 188625 December 1951) was an Australian politician.

He was born at Waverley in Sydney to surveyor Stephen Edward Perdriau and Grace Marion, née King. After attending Scots College and Sydney Grammar School he was employed by Dalgety's Ltd and then began farming on the Tweed River. During World War I he served in the Australian Imperial Force's 3rd Artillery Division and was wounded and invalided at the Battle of Passchendaele; he attained the rank of corporal. On 5 November 1916 he married Isabella Aitchison in London, with whom he had a daughter. He was elected to the New South Wales Legislative Assembly in 1920 as one of the members for Byron, a member of the Progressive Party. He served as Minister for Business Undertaking for one day, 20 December 1921. A coalitionist Progressive who had joined the Nationalist Party by 1922, Perdriau was defeated in 1925. On 29 August 1939 he married Myrtle May Webb, with whom he had four more children. He died at Kyogle in 1951.

References

1886 births
1951 deaths
Nationalist Party of Australia members of the Parliament of New South Wales
Members of the New South Wales Legislative Assembly
Politicians from Sydney
Australian military personnel of World War I
20th-century Australian politicians